Emiljano Shehaj (born 25 May 1989 in Fier) is an Albanian professional footballer who most recently played for Dinamo Tirana in the Albanian First Division.

References

1989 births
Living people
Sportspeople from Fier
Association football midfielders
Albanian footballers
Luftëtari Gjirokastër players
Bilisht Sport players
KF Bylis Ballsh players
KF Elbasani players
FK Dinamo Tirana players
Kategoria Superiore players
Kategoria e Parë players
Kategoria e Dytë players